Al-Suwaiq Club is an Omani sports club based in Al-Suwaiq. The club is currently playing in the Oman Professional League, top division of Oman Football Association. Their home ground is Al-Seeb Stadium. The stadium is government owned, but they also own their own personal stadium and sports equipment, as well as their own training facilities.

History
The club was founded on 28 February 1972 and was registered on 26 June 2002.

Support
Al-Suwaiq Club enjoys a large fan support which differentiates the club from the other clubs in the country by its unique way of cheering.

Being a multisport club
Although being mainly known for their football, Al-Suwaiq Club like many other clubs in Oman, have not only football in their list, but also hockey, volleyball, handball, basketball, badminton and squash. They also have a youth football team competing in the Omani Youth league.

Crest and colours
Al-Suwaiq Club have been known since establishment to wear a yellow or red (with black shorts) (Away) kit. They have also had many different sponsors over the years. As of now, Uhlsport provides them with kits. Currently, BankMuscat is featured on the team's shirt.

Honours and achievements

National titles
Oman Elite League (4):
Winners : 2009–10, 2010–11, 2012–13, 2017–18.

Sultan Qaboos Cup (3):
Winners : 2008, 2012, 2017.
Runners-up :

Oman Professional League Cup (0):
Winners :
Runners-up :

Oman Super Cup (1):
Winners : 2013.
Runners-up : 2009, 2010, 2011, 2017, 2018.

Club performance-International Competitions

AFC competitions
AFC Champions League : 1 appearance
2014 : Qualifying Play-Off Round 1
AFC Cup : 7 appearances
2009 : Group Stage
2011 : Group Stage
2012 : Round of 16
2014 : Group Stage
2017 : Group stage
2018 : Group stage
2019 : Group stage

Continental record

Current squad

|-----
! colspan="9" bgcolor="#B0D3FB" align="left" |
|----- bgcolor="#DFEDFD"

|-----
! colspan="9" bgcolor="#B0D3FB" align="left" |
|----- bgcolor="#DFEDFD"

|-----
! colspan="9" bgcolor="#B0D3FB" align="left" |
|----- bgcolor="#DFEDFD"

Personnel

Current technical staff

References

External links
Al-Suwaiq Club at Soccerway.com
Al-Suwaiq Club at Goalzz.com

Football clubs in Oman
Oman Professional League
Suwayq
Association football clubs established in 1970
1970 establishments in Oman